"Until She Comes" is a 1991 song by the English rock band the Psychedelic Furs, taken from their seventh studio album, World Outside. Written by the Psychedelic Furs and produced by the band with Stephen Street, it was released in June as the album's first single. The 12" version included a remix by Hugh Padgham.

Composition and reception
The lyrics of "Until She Comes" depict a metaphorical story about drug addiction. 
The single spent two weeks at No. 1 on the US Modern Rock Tracks chart in September 1991. 
Author Dave Thompson described the song as "bittersweet" and reminiscent of the band's 1981 single "Pretty in Pink".

Track listing
7" vinyl
"Until She Comes" - 3:38
"Make It Mine" - 3:55

CD single, 12" vinyl
"Until She Comes" - 3:50
"Make It Mine" - 3:57	
"Sometimes" - 4:14
"Until She Comes (Remix)" - 4:00

Chart performance

References

1991 singles
The Psychedelic Furs songs
Music videos directed by Meiert Avis
1991 songs
Columbia Records singles
Song recordings produced by Stephen Street
Songs about drugs